Morrow is a surname of Irish or Scottish origins.

Scottish

Originating in the Scottish Lowlands the name is ultimately Gaelic, from Moireach or Moireabh, meaning a 'seafarer' or a 'coastal settlement'; most probably derived from the placename Moray in northern Scotland, by merit of being, at times, a variation of Murray. It may also be patronymic, from Murchadh, meaning 'sea warrior'. It has been variously spelt Morow, Morro, Morwe, Murrow, and Morrewe, the latter being first found on the Ragman Rolls of 1296. Some of the earliest recorded of the name were the Dumfries-born, Thomas Morrow, abbot of Paisley between 1418 and 1444, Duncan Morrow, witness to an ordination in 1503 at Kirkinner, Wigtownshire, Walter Morrow, a member of the convent at Kelso, Roxburghshire in 1548, and Davy Morrow, bailie of Annan in 1592. During the 17th Century, the Morrow name was brought to Ireland as a result of the plantation of Ulster; during which many Scots, mostly Lowlanders, settled in the north of Ireland. A number of Morrows who served in the Covenanter army were transported to Virginia after being captured by Cromwell at the Battle of Worcester in 1651.

Irish

The name has been used to anglicize a number of Irish Gaelic names, mainly "Murchadh" (muir and cath) meaning "sea battle" or "sea warrior", which was also made as Morrogh, Murrow, Moroghoe, and Murphy. In Petty's Census of 1659, O'Morrow and McMarrowe are recorded. However, it is more common for these Irish names to have been anglicized as Murphy, and it was more likely to find 'McMorrow' as an anglicization of these names rather than the Scottish 'Morrow' on its own.

Notable people

 Addie Morrow (fl. 1980s), Irish political figure
 Alan Morrow (born 1936), Australian athlete in Australian Rules football
 Albert Morrow (1863–1927), Irish artist and illustrator
 Alex Zander Morrow (born 1989), American entertainer
 Aneesah Morrow (born 2003), American basketball player
 Anna Karen Morrow (1914–2009), American model and actress
 Anne Morrow Lindbergh (1906–2001), American aviator, author, born Anne Spencer Morrow
 Anthony Morrow (born 1985), American basketball player
 Barry Morrow (born 1948), American screenwriter and film producer
 Bill Morrow (disambiguation), several people
 Black Morrow, the name attached to a bandit killed in medieval Scotland
 Bob Morrow (1946–2018), Canadian political figure
 Bob Morrow (American football) (1918–2003), American football player and coach
 Bobby Morrow (1935–2020), American track athlete
 Brad Morrow (1942–1997), American child actor
 Bradford Morrow (born 1951), American author
 Brandon Morrow (born 1984), American baseball player
 Brenden Morrow (born 1979), Canadian hockey player
 Bruce Morrow (born 1937), American radio personality
 Bruce Morrow (author) (born 1963), American writer
 Bruce Morrow (footballer) (born 1936), Australian (soccer) football player
 Buddy Morrow (1919–2010), American musician
 Byron Morrow (1911–2006), American television and film actor
 Carla Morrow (born 1981), American fantasy artist
 Cecily Morrow, American figure skating coach
 Chris Morrow (born 1985), Northern Ireland footballer
 Cory Morrow (born 1972), American musician
 Clayton Morrow, (born 1974), American animator, son of Barry Morrow
 David Morrow (disambiguation), several people
 Don Morrow (1927–2020), American actor and radio personality
 Donald Morrow (1908–1995), Canadian political figure from Ontario
 Doretta Morrow (1928–1968), American actress and dancer
 Douglas Morrow (1913–1994), American screenwriter and film producer
 Dwight Morrow (1873–1931), American political figure
 E. Frederic Morrow (1906–1994), American political executive
 Edward Morrow (1934–2003), Transvaal-born Anglican priest and activist
 Edwin P. Morrow (1877–1935), American politician
 Elizabeth Cutter Morrow (1873–1955), American poet
 Felix Morrow (1906–1988), American newspaper and book publisher
 Geoff Morrow (fl. 1970s), American songwriter
 George Morrow (disambiguation), several people
 Gertrude Comfort Morrow, American architect
 Gray Morrow (1934–2001), American artist and illustrator
 Hamilton Morrow (1846–1922), Canadian politician
 Harold Morrow (born 1973), American football player
 Honoré Willsie Morrow (1880-1940), American author and magazine editor
 Irving Morrow (1884–1952), American architect
 Jack Morrow (1872–1926), Northern Ireland illustrator and cartoonist
 James Morrow (disambiguation), several people
 Jay Johnson Morrow (1870–1937), American military figure and Governor of the Panama Canal Zone
 Jeff Morrow (1907–1993), American film actor
 Jeremiah Morrow (1771–1852), American political figure
 John Morrow (disambiguation), any of several men with the name
 Joseph McKeen Morrow (1832–1899), American politician
 Joshua Morrow (born 1974), American television actor
 Julian Morrow (born 1975), Australian comedian and television producer
 Juliet Morrow (born 1962), American archeologist and academic
 Justin Morrow (born 1987), American soccer player
 Karen Morrow (born 1936), American singer and stage actress
 Ken Morrow (born 1956), American hockey player
 Kevyn Morrow (fl. 1980–2000s), American actor
 Kirby Morrow (1973–2020), Canadian voice actor, comedian
 Lance Morrow (born 1939), American academic and author
 Liza Morrow (fl. 1980s), American actress
 Margaret M. Morrow (born 1950), American jurist
 Mari Morrow (born 1974), Barbados-born American actress
 Mark Morrow (born 1960), Canadian politician
 Marlene Morrow (born 1954), American model
 Maurice Morrow, Baron Morrow (born 1948), Northern Ireland political figure
 Max Morrow (born 1991), Canadian actor
 Melvyn Morrow (born 1942), Australian playwright
 Michele Morrow (born 1978), American actress
 Monica Morrow (fl. 2000s), American surgeon
 Nellie Morrow Parker, African American school teacher, born Nellie K. Morrow
 Neyle Morrow (1914–2006), American film and television actor
 Patricia Morrow (born 1944), American lawyer and actress
 Patrick Morrow (born 1952), Canadian photographer and mountaineer
 Philip Morrow (born 1962), Northern Ireland television producer
 Prince A. Morrow (1846–1913), American physician and education activist
 Rob Morrow (born 1962), American actor
Robert Morrow (disambiguation), several people
 Robin Morrow (born 1942), Australian lecturer, author and editor
 Sam Morrow (born 1985), Irish football player
 Scott Morrow (born 1969), American ice hockey player
 Scott Morrow (ice hockey, born 2002) (born 2002), American ice hockey player
 Simmone Morrow (born 1976), Australian softball player
 Steve Morrow (born 1970), Northern Irish footballer
 Susan Morrow (1931–1985), American actress
 Suzanne Morrow (1930–2008), Canadian figure skater
 Terry Morrow (born 1963), American politician
 Thomas Morrow (Australian politician) (1888–1971), Australian politician
 Thomas Z. Morrow (1836–1913), American soldier and politician
 Tom Morrow (American football) (born 1938), American football player
 Tom Morrow (footballer) (1923–2002), Australian rules football player
 Vic Morrow (1929–1982), American actor
 Vicki Morrow (fl. 1980s), American softball player
 Victoria Morrow (fl. 2000s), American television writer and producer
 W. C. Morrow (1854–1923), American author
 William Morrow (disambiguation), several people

Fictional characters

 Clay Morrow, in the television series Sons of Anarchy
 Ernest Morrow, in the novel The Catcher in the Rye
 Captain Grace Morrow, in the video game Sea of Thieves
 Hisoka Morrow, antagonist in the manga Hunter X Hunter
 Jerome Morrow, in the film Gattaca
 Nicholas Morrow, in the novel series Sweet Valley High
 Regina Morrow, in the novel series Sweet Valley High
 T. O. Morrow, supervillain in the DC Comics universe

References

External link

English-language surnames
Surnames of Ulster-Scottish origin
Surnames of Lowland Scottish origin
Patronymic surnames
Anglicised Irish-language surnames
Scottish surnames
Anglicised Scottish Gaelic-language surnames